Connecticut Landmarks is a non-profit organization that has restored and operates significant historic house museums in Connecticut. Headquartered in Hartford, Connecticut, the organization was founded in 1936 as the Antiquarian & Landmarks Society. Connecticut Landmarks currently owns a statewide network of historic properties that span four centuries of history. The organization's mission is to "use historic properties to inspire an understanding of our complex past. The organization's vision is to have "A state whose understanding of its diverse past inspires its people to move forward together as one." The organization is part of the International Coalition of Sites of Conscience.

Properties
 Amasa Day House in Moodus  - open by appointment only
 Amos Bull House in Hartford - offices only
 Bellamy-Ferriday House and Garden in Bethlehem
 Butler-McCook House & Garden in Hartford
 Buttolph–Williams House in Wethersfield, Connecticut - operated in partnership with the Webb-Deane-Stevens Museum.
 Joshua Hempsted House in New London
Nathaniel Hempsted House in New London
 Isham-Terry House in Hartford - open by appointment only
Forge Farm in Stonington - not currently open to the public
 Nathan Hale Homestead in Coventry (bequeathed by George Dudley Seymour in 1945)
 Phelps-Hatheway House & Garden in Suffield
 Palmer-Warner House in East Haddam - currently open by appointment only during the development phase.

Image Gallery

Formerly Owned Properties 
The Antiquarian and Landmarks Society, now Connecticut Landmarks, has been bequeathed historic sites that have been sold or transferred to other partners over the 85 years of existence. Some of these sites include:

 Avery Copp House in Groton
 Richard Mansfield House in Ansonia
 Charles Boardman Smith House (Upjohn House) in Hartford

Investigation & Resolution
In February 2018, a series of articles was published by The Day detailing the alleged neglect of historic properties under their care, not following bequest terms, and misuse of funds. As a result, the attorney general's office opened an investigation, stating: "I can confirm that our office's investigation has expanded to include a comprehensive review of Connecticut Landmarks' processes and performance in complying with charitable restrictions and obligations on assets its holds and manages."

In January of 2019, the Connecticut Office of the Attorney General issued a report that "Connecticut Landmarks did not misapproriate any charitable funds in its stewardship of Forge Farm in Stonington and a historic home in East Haddam." Connecticut Landmarks committed to implementing recommended procedural and administrative changes that were recommended. "Our office has completed a comprehensive review of Connecticut Landmarks’ use of charitable funds, consistent with the Attorney General’s statutory authority to safeguard charitable assets. Connecticut Landmarks was forthcoming with information, and we have appreciated their cooperation throughout our review. We found no evidence of misappropriation of charitable funds, but have identified areas where we would like to see Connecticut Landmarks better address donor intent and the management and preservation of both its real and personal property.”

References

External links
 Connecticut Landmarks - 

 
Museums in Hartford County, Connecticut
Historic house museums in Connecticut